Yadollah Sharifirad (born 24 March 1946, in Taleqan) is an Iranian former fighter pilot, former military attaché and writer. In 1978, he was a member of Golden Crown aerobatic team. Sharifirad was one of the most successful Iranian Northrop F-5 pilots during the Iran-Iraq war. He shot down five Iraqi fighter aircraft (three confirmed and two possible). The victories include one Su-22 and four MiG-21s. In an air raid on an Iraqi power station, he was attacked by three Iraqi fighters and shot down. He ejected and was returned to Iran by Iraqi Kurdish guerrillas. A movie called Eagles was made about this event. 

From 1984 until 1987, Sharifirad served as a military attaché in Pakistan. In 1987, he was ordered back to Iran by the government; upon his return, Sharifirad was accused of spying for the United States and imprisoned for over a year before being released. Sharifirad then escaped to Canada.

In 2010, Sharifirad wrote a book titled Flight of a Patriot, recounting the story of his life from his youth until his participation in the Iran-Iraq war, his arrest, imprisonment and torture, and immigration to Canada.

See Also
 Iran–Pakistan relations
Nader Jahanbani
Iranian Revolution
Iranian Canadians
List of Iranian aerial victories during the Iran–Iraq war

References

1946 births
Living people
Islamic Republic of Iran Air Force personnel
Iranian aviators
Military aviators
Islamic Republic of Iran Army personnel of the Iran–Iraq War
Prisoners and detainees of Iran
Iranian emigrants to Canada
Iranian expatriates in Pakistan
Golden Crown
Shot-down aviators